X2 may refer to:

Computers
 X2 (protocol), a pre-V.90 standard for 56k downstream modem communications
 Athlon 64 X2, the first dual-core desktop CPU manufactured by AMD
 A two-lane PCI Express, slot
 A type of 10 Gigabit Ethernet, optical transceiver
 X2, a transport interface used to connect enodeBs in a LTE/4G network

Vehicles and transportation
 Bathyscaphe Trieste II, also known as X-2, the US Navy bathyscaphe based on the Trieste
 Bell X-2, an experimental supersonic aircraft
 BMW X2, a SUV vehicle produced by BMW
 HMS X2, a Royal Navy submarine
 Kawasaki X2, a personal water craft
 Mitsubishi X-2 Shinshin, a Japanese experimental stealth fighter (formerly known as ATD-X)
 North Wing Sport X2, an American ultralight trike design
 Orba, also known as X-2, a planned British satellite
 Sikorsky X2, a prototype, coaxial high-speed helicopter
 SJ X2, used for the X 2000 train system in Sweden
 Skycycle X-2, a rocket used by Evel Knievel
 SpaceShipOne flight 17P, also known as X2, the second Ansari X Prize flight
 X-2 Dragonfly, the company designation of the Rotor-Craft XR-11 experimental helicopter of the late 1940s
 X2 (New York City bus)
 X2, a Metrobus route, in Washington, D.C.
 X-2 Rocket, the spacecraft used in Mission: Space in Epcot Center, Orlando, Florida

Video games
 Dance Dance Revolution X2, a 2010 music video game for the PlayStation 2
 Final Fantasy X-2, a 2003 role-playing video game
 Mega Man X2, a 1994 platform game
 X2: The Threat, a 2003 space simulation game
 X2 (video game), a 1997 video game
 X2, the main character in Star Wars Battlefront: Elite Squadron

Film
 X2 (film), a 2003 sequel to the 2000 film X-Men
 XXX: State of the Union, also known as X2 or xXx²: The Next Level, a 2005 American film

Other
 X2 (roller coaster), at Six Flags Magic Mountain
 Chi-squared distribution, a theoretical probability distribution in inferential statistics
 Square (algebra), also known as the algebraic square
 Nokia X2, feature phone/smartphone
 Sendo X2, a Series 60 mobile phone
 Sony Ericsson Xperia X2, smartphone
 Keyboard sold by Korg in the 1990s
 X-2 Counter Espionage Branch, counterintelligence branch of the Office of Strategic Services

See also
 2X (disambiguation)